Dave Finzer is a former professional American football player who played punter for two seasons for the Chicago Bears and Seattle Seahawks.  He led the NFL in punts inside the 20-yard line with 26 in 1984.  He graduated from Loyola Academy in 1978, before kicking for the University of Illinois, and then transferring to Division III DePauw University in Indiana, where he played punter and kicker.

College career
Finzer began his college career at University of Illinois, where he currently is tied for the 4th longest kick in Illini history. Finzer then transferred to DePauw University, where he continued to kick and punt. He graduated in 1982.

Professional career
In 1982, Finzer was a member of the Dallas Cowboys training camp, but did not make the team. The next season, the Chicago Bears signed him as a free agent, but he was cut once again. Finzer joined the San Diego Chargers for the 1984 preseason, before being traded to the Bears in exchange for a draft pick. He played in all 16 games for the Bears, as well as two playoff games. Against the New Orleans Saints, Finzer had a 87 yard punt, which at the top was the 5th longest in NFL history and 2nd longest in Bears history. Finzer was cut by the Bears at the end of the season for the same player that beat him out on the Chargers, Maury Buford. He then joined the Seattle Seahawks for the 1985 season, where he played in 12 games.

Personal life
After Dave’s playing days, he went on to work for family business, Finzer Roller, the largest manufacturing of rollers in the United States.

References

1959 births
American football punters
Chicago Bears players
Seattle Seahawks players
Illinois Fighting Illini football players
Living people
DePauw Tigers football players
Players of American football from Chicago